Kremenetsky Uyezd (Кременецкий уезд) was one of the subdivisions of the Volhynian Governorate of the Russian Empire. It was situated in the southern part of the governorate. Its administrative centre was Kremenets.

Demographics
At the time of the Russian Empire Census of 1897, Kremenetsky Uyezd had a population of 219,934. Of these, 80.7% spoke Ukrainian, 12.2% Yiddish, 3.4% Russian, 3.0% Polish, 0.3% Tatar, 0.1% Czech and 0.1% German as their native language.

References

 
Uezds of Volhynian Governorate
Volhynian Governorate